Anthony Bardaro (born 18 September 1992) is a Canadian-Italian professional ice hockey forward who is currently playing for HC Pustertal Wölfe in the ICE Hockey League (ICEHL) and the Italian national team.

Bardaro previously played professionally with Asiago Hockey 1935 in the Alps Hockey League and Serie A before joining top Italian club, HC Bolzano of the then EBEL, on April 12, 2019.

He represented Italy at the 2019 IIHF World Championship.

References

External links

1992 births
Living people
Asiago Hockey 1935 players
Bolzano HC players
Ice hockey people from British Columbia
Italian ice hockey forwards
People from Delta, British Columbia
Prince Albert Raiders players
HC Pustertal Wölfe players
Spokane Chiefs players
UBC Thunderbirds ice hockey players
Surrey Eagles players
Canadian sportspeople of Italian descent